Revenge of a Crazy Girl is a 1951 Italian historical melodrama film written and directed by Pino Mercanti. It is loosely based on the novel La vendetta di una pazza written by Carolina Invernizio.

Cast 

Lída Baarová as Paola Micheli
Otello Toso as  Carlo
Mino Doro as  Rodolfo Micheli 
 Jacqueline Plessis as  Gianna
Brunella Bovo as  Anna Maria Micheli 
Gino Leurini as  Stefano
Paola Quattrini as Young Anna Maria Micheli  
 Margherita Nicosia as  Amalia
Mirko Ellis as  Andrea
Olinto Cristina as  Paola Micheli's father
Ignazio Balsamo

References

External links
 
Archivio cinema ANICA

1951 films
Films directed by Pino Mercanti
Melodrama films
Italian historical drama films
1950s historical drama films
Italian black-and-white films
1950s Italian films